V. K. Lakshmanan (c. 1932 – 25 August 2012) was an Indian politician and former Member of the Legislative Assembly of Tamil Nadu. He was elected to the Tamil Nadu legislative assembly as an Indian National Congress candidate from Coimbatore East constituency in 1991 election and as a Tamil Maanila Congress in 1996 and 2001 elections.

References 

Indian National Congress politicians from Tamil Nadu
2012 deaths
Year of birth uncertain
Tamil Nadu MLAs 1996–2001
Tamil Nadu MLAs 2001–2006
Tamil Nadu MLAs 1991–1996